John II of Mecklenburg ( – 12 October 1299) was from 1264 until his death Lord of Mecklenburg.

He was the youngest son of John I and Luitgard of Henneberg (1210-1267), the daughter of Count Poppo VII of Henneberg.  After his brother Henry I was taken prisoner during his pilgrimage, he took over the regency of Mecklenburg and the guardianship of Henry's sons in 1275, along with his brother Nicholas III.

In 1283 he was then referred to as Lord  of Gadebusch.  He probably received Gadebush as an apanage.

He died on 12 October 1299 and was buried in the Doberan Minster.

Three of his children have been documented:
 Lütgard, died after 2 August 1353
 John, died young
 Elizabeth, died after 1352, abbess of Rehna Abbey

References 
 Friedrich Wigger: Stammtafeln des Großherzoglichen Hauses von Meklenburg, in: Jahrbücher des Vereins für Mecklenburgische Geschichte und Altertumskunde, vol. 50, 1885, p. 111 ff, (Online)

Lords of Mecklenburg
1250s births
1299 deaths
Year of birth uncertain
13th-century German nobility